Eodiaptomus lumholtzi is a species of copepod endemic to Australia. It is one of only two species in the family Diaptomidae to occur in Australia, the other being Tropodiaptomus australis. It is listed as a vulnerable species on the IUCN Red List.

References

Diaptomidae
Freshwater crustaceans of Australia
Vulnerable fauna of Australia
Crustaceans described in 1889
Taxonomy articles created by Polbot